is a lighthouse on the island of Ainoshima, which is administered by Kokurakita-ku, Kitakyūshū, Japan.

See also

 List of lighthouses in Japan

References

Lighthouses completed in 1873
Lighthouses in Japan
Buildings and structures in Kitakyushu